"Coming Out of the Dark" is a song by Cuban-American singer and songwriter Gloria Estefan. It was released on January 10, 1991, worldwide by Epic Records as the leading and first single from her second album, Into the Light (1991). It was written by Estefan with her husband Emilio Estefan, Jr. and Jon Secada, and produced by Estefan Jr., Jorge Casas and Clay Ostwald. It became the singer's third number one in the United States and second number one in Canada (solo and with Miami Sound Machine). The song is a soul ballad which includes the use of a choir. Among the voices in the choir are Estefan's colleague, the Cuban singer Jon Secada, and the R&B singer Betty Wright (both had participated in backing vocals on her debut solo album, Cuts Both Ways as well as Into the Light). The song's accompanying music video received heavy rotation on MTV Europe. 

This is the first single released after Estefan's accident on March 20, 1990—an 18-wheeler rammed her tour bus, nearly causing the singer's death—when her "Get on Your Feet Tour" was in progress. It is also the first song that Estefan performed publicly after recovering, inspired by the near-fatal accident and also is dedicated to her husband. The title was inspired by a phrase her husband had written on a piece of paper as a helicopter transported her for delicate surgery to repair her broken back. She explained to Billboard: "My husband had been in one of the helicopters traveling from one hospital to the other. It was really dark and gray, and he was traumatized. He got this ray of light that hit him in the face, and he got the idea for 'Coming Out of the Dark'."

Estefan was careful not to turn Into the Light into a pity party. "I hate pity," she told the Los Angeles Daily News. "I'm very self-reliant and independent, and I'm used to that role. I don't like people feeling sorry for me. So I wrote 'Coming Out of the Dark' to let the people around me know how important they are to me. But that was as far as I wanted to go with the accident. I didn't want this to become 'the album on the accident.' What am I going to sing - 'Oh, this bus hit me'?"

Chart performance
The song was a number one hit on both the US Billboard Hot 100 and Adult Contemporary charts (and her last to date on both charts). The song was also a hit in Canada, Spain and Japan. However, it didn't have as much impact in the rest of Europe, where Estefan had always been popular. In Ireland, the single only reached the top 20; and in UK reached the top 40, a very low position in comparison to other singles.

Critical reception
AllMusic editor Jason Birchmeier highlighted the song in his review of Into the Light, calling it a "memorable" ballad. Upon the release, Larry Flick from Billboard wrote that this "uplifting, gospel-framed ballad" is "bolstered by a striking and inspirational performance." Bill Wyman from Entertainment Weekly wrote that "Coming Out of the Dark" is a "pretty song about Estefan's recovery. It starts out slow, then brings its point home with a gospel-like chorus reminiscent of Michael Jackson's "Man in the Mirror". It's hard not to be sympathetic — the song is an anthem to hope and indomitability, and someone who's endured Estefan's pain certainly deserves room to talk about it." Mario Tarradell from Knight Ridder viewed it as a "gospel-tinged showpiece". Pan-European magazine Music & Media remarked that with a "comeback in glory after a heavy tourbus accident, Estefan shines in this gospel type of song. Inspired by the strong backing vocals, she climbs her way back to the top. Parry Gettelman from Orlando Sentinel wrote that the song "has a pretty vocal although the melody sounds like something destined for a Kodak commercial. The gospel-choir effect of the backing vocals seems more an homage to Madonna's "Like a Prayer" than a spiritual statement." A reviewer from People Magazine deemed it as "standard dance pop". Caroline Sullivan from Smash Hits felt that it "starts off slow, then perks up a touch and cracks along at a lively pace for the rest of the song."

Retrospective response
In 2019, Bill Lamb from About.com described the song as a "gorgeous hit ballad", adding that it is now considered one of the top inspirational pop hits of all time. In an 2021 retrospective review, Matthew Hocter from Albumism viewed it as "one of her finest". Maryann Scheufele from AXS ranked the song among her ten "best songs" in 2014, remarking that Estefan "truly has been blessed with an inspirational voice." The Daily Vault's Mark Millan named it one of three "real hits" of the album, with "Live for Loving You" and "Seal Our Fate". Pip Ellwood-Hughes from Entertainment Focus declared it as "one of the most poignant songs" of Estefan's career. Leah Greenblatt from Entertainment Weekly described it as a "poignant gospel-tinged ballad".

Spanish version ("Desde La Oscuridad")
Estefan also recorded the Spanish version of the song, called "Desde la Oscuridad". The song was released to Latin-American radio stations and the considerable airplay it received took the song to the Top Five of the Hot Latin Songs chart.

Track listings

Charts

Weekly charts

Year-end charts

References

1990s ballads
1991 singles
1991 songs
Billboard Hot 100 number-one singles
Cashbox number-one singles
Epic Records singles
Gloria Estefan songs
Gospel songs
Pop ballads
RPM Top Singles number-one singles
Song recordings produced by Emilio Estefan
Songs written by Emilio Estefan
Songs written by Gloria Estefan
Songs written by Jon Secada